St. John's Episcopal Church and Rectory is a historic Episcopal church at 15 St. John's Street in Monticello, Sullivan County, New York.  It was built between 1879 and 1881 and is "L" shaped in plan, consisting of the church and an attached chapel. It is built of quarry-faced, randomly laid coursed stone. The church features a tall, engaged corner three stage entrance tower with a crenellated top.

It was added to the National Register of Historic Places in 2002.

References

Churches completed in 1881
19th-century Episcopal church buildings
Episcopal church buildings in New York (state)
Churches on the National Register of Historic Places in New York (state)
Gothic Revival church buildings in New York (state)
Churches in Sullivan County, New York
National Register of Historic Places in Sullivan County, New York
1881 establishments in New York (state)